Hugo Boss AG, often styled as BOSS, is a luxury fashion brand fashion house headquartered in Metzingen, Baden-Württemberg, Germany. The company sells clothing, accessories, footwear, and fragrances. Its stock is a component of the MDAX.

The company was founded in 1924 by Hugo Boss and originally produced general-purpose clothing. With the onset of the Great Depression and the rise of Nazism in the early 1930s, Boss began to produce uniforms for the Nazi Party. Boss would eventually supply the wartime German government with military uniforms, resulting in a large boost in sales.

After World War II and the founder's death in 1948, Hugo Boss started to turn its focus from uniforms to men's suits. The company went public in 1988 and introduced a fragrance line that same year, adding men's and women's wear diffusion lines in 1997, a full women's collection in 2000, and children's clothing in 2006–2007. The company has since evolved into a major global fashion house. , it owned more than 1,113 retail stores worldwide.

History

Early years 
In 1923, Hugo Boss founded his own clothing company in Metzingen, Germany, where it still operates. In 1924, he started a factory along with two partners. The company produced shirts, jackets, work clothing, sportswear, and raincoats. Due to the economic climate of Germany at the time, Boss was forced into bankruptcy. In 1931, he reached an agreement with his creditors, leaving him with six sewing machines to start again.

Manufacturing for the Nazi Party 

That same year, Hugo Boss became a member of the Nazi Party, receiving the membership number 508 889, and a sponsoring member ("Förderndes Mitglied") of the Schutzstaffel (SS). He also joined the German Labour Front in 1936, the Reich Air Protection Association in 1939, and the National Socialist People's Welfare in 1941. He was also a member of the Reichskriegerbund and the Reichsbund for physical exercises. Though he claimed in a 1934–35 advertisement that he had been a "supplier for National Socialist uniforms since 1924", it is probable that he did not begin to supply them until 1928 at the earliest. This is the year he became a Reichszeugmeisterei-licensed supplier of uniforms to the Sturmabteilung (SA), Schutzstaffel (SS), Wehrmacht, Hitler Youth, National Socialist Motor Corps, and other party organizations.

By the third quarter of 1932, the all-black SS uniform was designed by SS members Karl Diebitsch (artist) and Walter Heck (graphic designer). The Hugo Boss company was one of the companies that produced these black uniforms for the SS. By 1938, the firm was focused on producing Wehrmacht uniforms and later also uniforms for the Waffen-SS.

During the Second World War, Hugo Boss employed 140 forced laborers, the majority of them women. In addition to these workers, 40 French prisoners of war also worked for the company briefly between October 1940 – April 1941. According to German historian Henning Kober, the company managers were fervent Nazis who were all great admirers of Adolf Hitler. In 1945, Hugo Boss had a photograph in his apartment of him with Hitler, taken at the Berghof, Hitler's Obersalzberg retreat.

Because of his early Nazi Party membership, his financial support of the SS, and the uniforms delivered to the Nazi party, Boss was considered both an "activist" and a "supporter and beneficiary of National Socialism". (£54,008 stg). However, Boss appealed, and he was eventually classified as a ‘follower’, a lesser category, which meant that he was not regarded as an active promoter of National Socialism.

He died in 1948, but his business survived. In 2011, the company issued a statement of "profound regret to those who suffered harm or hardship at the factory run by Hugo Boss under National Socialist rule".

Post-war 
As a result of the ban on Boss being in business, his son-in-law Eugen Holy took over ownership and running of the company. In 1950, after a period supplying work uniforms, the company received its first order for men's suits, resulting in an expansion to 150 employees by the end of the year. By 1960, the company was producing ready-made suits. In 1969, Eugen retired, leaving the company to his sons Jochen and Uwe, who began international development. In 1970, the first Boss branded suits were produced, with the brand becoming a registered trademark in 1977. This was followed by the start of the company's long association with motorsport, sponsoring Formula One driver Niki Lauda, and later the McLaren Racing team.

In 1984, the first Boss branded fragrance appeared. This helped the company gain the required growth for listing on the Frankfurt Stock Exchange the following year. The brand began sponsorship of golf with Bernhard Langer in 1986 and tennis with the Davis Cup in 1987. In 1989, Boss launched its first licensed sunglasses. Later that year, the company was bought by a Japanese group.

After the Marzotto textile group acquired a 77.5% stake for $165,000,000 in 1991, the Hugo and Baldessarini brands were introduced in 1993. In 1995, the company launched its footwear range, the first in a now fully developed leather products range across all sub-brands. A partnership with the Solomon R. Guggenheim Foundation was launched in 1995, resulting in the Hugo Boss Prize, an annual $100,000 stipend in modern arts presented since 1996.

Recent history

In 2005, Marzotto spun off its fashion brands into the Valentino Fashion Group, which was then sold to Permira private equity group. In March 2015, Permira announced plans to sell the remaining shareholding of 12%. Since the Exit by Permira, 91% of the shares floated on the Börse Frankfurt, and the residual 2% was held by the company. 7% of the shares are owned by the Marzotto family. Hugo Boss has at least 6,102 points of sale in 124 countries. Hugo Boss AG directly owns over 364 shops, 537 mono-brand shops, and over 1,000 franchisee-owned shops.

In 2009, BOSS Hugo Boss was by far the largest segment, consisting of 68% of all sales. The remainder of sales were made up by Boss Orange at 17%, BOSS Selection at 3%, Boss Green at 3% and HUGO at 9%.

In 2010, the company had sales of $2,345,850,000 and a net profit of $262,183,000, with royalties of 42% of total net profit. In June 2013, Jason Wu was named artistic director of Boss Womenswear.

In 2017, the sales of Hugo Boss climbed by 7 percent during the final quarter of the year.

Products

Hugo Boss has two core brands, Boss and Hugo.

Products are manufactured in a variety of locations, including the company's own production sites in: Metzingen, Germany; Morrovalle, Italy; Radom, Poland; Izmir, Turkey; and Cleveland, United States.

Hugo Boss has  invested in technology for its made-to-measure program, using   machines for almost all the tailoring  traditionally made by hand.

Hugo Boss has licensing agreements with various companies to produce Hugo Boss branded products. These include agreements with Samsung, HTC and Huawei to produce mobile phones; Nike, Inc. to produce sports equipment; C.W.F. Children Worldwide Fashion SAS to produce children's clothing; Coty to produce fragrances and skincare; Movado to produce watches; and Safilo to produce sunglasses and eyewear.

In 2020, Hugo Boss created its first vegan men's suit, using all non-animal materials, dyes, and chemicals.

Controversies

Russell Brand
British comedian and actor Russell Brand was at the 2013 GQ awards, which were sponsored by Hugo Boss. After receiving an award on stage, Brand proceeded to talk about Hugo Boss's Nazi connection and did a goose step. He was later ejected from the ceremony and later apologized.

Wages
In March 2010, Hugo Boss was boycotted by actor Danny Glover for the company's plans to close the plant in Brooklyn, Ohio, after 375 employees of the Workers United Union reportedly rejected the Hugo Boss proposal to cut the workers' hourly wage 36% from $13 an hour to $8.30. After an initial statement by CFO Andreas Stockert saying the company had a responsibility to shareholders and would move suit manufacturing from Ohio to other facilities in Turkey, Bulgaria, and Romania, the company capitulated to the boycott and cancelled the project. Renewed plans to close the plant in April 2015 also failed.

Mirror fall
In September 2015, Hugo Boss (UK) was fined £1.2m in relation to the death in June 2013 of a child who died four days after suffering fatal head injuries at its store in Bicester, Oxfordshire. The four-year-old boy had been injured when a steel-framed fitting-room mirror weighing  fell on him. Oxford Crown Court had earlier been told that it had "negligently been left free-standing without any fixings" and the coroner had said that the death was an "accident waiting to happen". In June 2015, Hugo Boss (UK) had admitted its breach of both the Health and Safety at Work Act 1974 and Management of Health and Safety at Work regulations 1999. The company's legal representative said:

Trademark
In August 2019, Hugo Boss sent a cease & desist letter, objecting to the trademark application of Boss Brewing, a small brewery based in Swansea, costing the brewery nearly £10,000 in legal fees and compelling them to change the name of several beer brands. In February 2020, professedly as a protest, comedian Joe Lycett changed his legal name to Hugo Boss.

Cotton from Xinjiang
In 2020, Hugo Boss told NBC News it did not use cotton from the Xinjiang area of China to avoid Uyghur forced labor. However, in 2021, the Chinese subsidiary of Hugo Boss stated on its official Sina Weibo account that they had been using cotton from the region and would continue to do so:  The statement was later edited to simply saying they have partners "in various regions of China" with a link to an English-language page on their website, which in turn linked to another statement containing the following words: "HUGO BOSS has not procured any goods originating in the Xinjiang region from direct suppliers." Initially attracting thousands of likes, the edited Weibo post received many comments accusing the brand of hypocrisy. A company spokeswoman stated that the original Weibo post was unauthorized and that the company's position has not changed. According to the company's official statement, all materials are only sourced from suppliers that comply with the HUGO BOSS Supplier Code of Conduct.

In September 2021, the European Center for Constitutional and Human Rights filed a complaint with German prosecutors accusing Hugo Boss from abetting and profiting from forced labor in Xinjiang. In 2022, researchers from Nordhausen University of Applied Sciences identified cotton from Xinjiang in Hugo Boss shirts.

Sponsorships

Athletics

Players 

  Alica Schmidt

Tennis

Players
 Matteo Berrettini  (Global Ambassador) (From 2022)

Formula One

Teams
McLaren (1987 - 2014)
Mercedes-Benz (2015 - 2018)
Aston Martin (2022 - 2025)

See also 
 Hugo Boss Prize
 List of companies involved in the Holocaust

References

External links 
 
 Corporate website
 

Clothing brands of Germany
High fashion brands
Perfume houses
Suit makers
Underwear brands
Companies based in Baden-Württemberg
Clothing companies established in 1924
German companies established in 1924
Germany home front during World War II
Eyewear brands of Germany
Valentino Fashion Group
Companies in the MDAX
Sportswear brands
1980s initial public offerings
Companies listed on the Frankfurt Stock Exchange